Crown Prince Mian (died 707 BC) was the eldest son and designated successor of Duke Huan of Chen, the twelfth ruler of the ancient Chinese state of Chen during the early Spring and Autumn period. His given name was Mian (免).

In the first month of 707 BC, Prince Mian's father Duke Huan died under strange circumstances. He was believed to have become demented, and went missing for sixteen days before his body was found. In the chaos that ensued, Prince Mian was murdered by his uncle Chen Tuo, the younger brother of Duke Huan. Chen Tuo usurped the throne to become the thirteenth ruler of Chen.

Prince Mian had a younger brother named Yue, whose mother was a princess of the neighbouring State of Cai. After Chen Tuo's usurpation, the Cai army attacked and killed Chen Tuo in the eighth month of 706 BC. The marquis of Cai then installed Yue on the Chen throne, to be known as Duke Li of Chen. After Duke Li died, he was succeeded by two younger brothers: Lin, Duke Zhuang of Chen, and Chujiu, Duke Xuan of Chen.

See also
Crown Prince Yukou

References

Bibliography

Chen (state)
707 BC deaths
Chinese princes
Zhou dynasty nobility
Heirs apparent who never acceded